The 22nd edition of the Vodafone Ghana Music Awards was held on the 25th and 26th days of June, 2021 at the Grand Arena of the Accra International Conference Centre in Accra to recognize the works of artists in the year under review. It was broadcast by TV3 locally in Ghana and Akwaaba Magic outside Ghana, both accessible outside Ghana via DStv and GOtv.

Performances

Presenters
 Giovani Caleb 
 AJ Akuoko-Sarpong
 Berla Mundi
 Sika Osei

Winners and nominees 
This is the list of winners for the 2021 edition of the event.

Notes

References 

Vodafone Ghana Music Awards
International music awards
African music awards